Mezipatra is a Czech queer film festival screening films with gay, lesbian, bisexual and transgender themes. The name Mezipatra translates as "mezzanine" and refers to the festival's mission: creating space for meeting of people regardless of their gender or sexual identities. Each edition explores a chosen theme and hosts a variety of international guests. The accompanying events range from lectures and debates to art openings, theatre performances as well as exciting parties. It takes place annually in November in Prague and Brno with related events in Ostrava, Olomouc and other cities in Czech Republic. Throughout the year Mezipatra offers additional screenings within the Mezipatra Approved edition. Mezipatra also participates in Prague Pride festival by organizing screenings and debates with LGBT themes.

History 
The festival was founded in Brno in 2000 as an accompanying program of the Gay Men CZ competition. The following year was already organized as a separate event – a film show called Duha nad Brnem (Rainbow over Brno). In 2002 the festival started using the name Mezipatra with the subtitle czech gay and lesbian film festival. In the same year, the festival expanded to Prague and in subsequent years to other cities of the Czech Republic and Slovakia. Since 2009, the festival has used the new subtitle queer film festival. Mezipatra was founded by a civic association called STUD Brno. Since 2013 it is organized by a registered association Mezipatra, STUD is a co-organizer under the license agreement.

Winners 

As of the 4th edition, Mezipatra introduced jury awards. The winners have been:

Main Jury Award for Best Feature Film

 2021: Jumbo, Zoé Wittock, France/Belgium/Luxembourg
2020: No Hard Feelings, Faraz Shariat, Germany
2019: Adam, Rhys Ernst, USA
2018: We The Animals, Jeremiah Zagar, USA
2017: Beach Rats, Eliza Hittman, USA
 2016: The Ornithologist (O Ornitólogo), João Pedro Rodrigues, Portugal/France/Brazil
 2015: Sworn Virgin (2015 film) (Vergine giurat), Laura Bispuri, Italy/Switzerland/Germany/Albania 
 2014: Something Must Break (Nånting måste gå sönder), Ester Martin Bergsmark, Sweden
 2013: Rosie (Rosie), Marcel Gisler, Germany
 2012: Keep the Lights On, Ira Sachs, United States
 2011: Trigger, Bruce McDonald, Canada
 2010: 80 Days (80 Egunean), Jon Garaño & José Mari Goenaga, Spain
 2009: Morrer como um homem, João Pedro Rodrigues, France/Portugal
 2008: My Friend from Faro (Mein Freund aus Faro), Nana Neul, Germany
 2007: Les Témoins, André Téchiné, France
 2006: Whole New Thing, Amnon Buchbinder, Canada
 2005: Cachorro, Miguel Albaladejo, Spain
 2004: Do I Love You?, Lisa Gornick, UK
 2003: Oi! Warning, Benjamin & Dominik Reding, Germany

Student Jury Award for Best Short Film

 2021: Son of Sodom, Thea Montoya, Colombia
2020: Hugo at 6:30pm, Helloco Simon, France
2019: Crash and Burn, Honey, Dawid Ullgren, Sweden
2018: Pre-Drink, Marc-Antoine Lemire, Canada
2017: Tranzicija, Milica Tomović, Serbia
 2016: Takk for turen, Henrik Martin Dahlsbakken, Norway
 2015: 9:55–11:00, Ingrid Ekman, Bergsgatan 4B, Cristine Berglund & Sophie Vukovic, Sweden
 2014: Vacance, Hyun-Ju Lee, South Korea
 2013: Ta av mig, Victor Lindgren, Sweden
 2012: , Serbia/Germany
 2011: Two Beds, Kanoko Wynkoop, United States
 2010: Tom, Nimrod Shapira, Israel
 2009: Haboged, Tomer Velkoff, Israel
 2008: Bræðrabylta, Grímur Hákonarson, Iceland
 2007: Who's the Top?, Jennie Livingston, USA
 2006: Offerte speciali, Gianni Gatti, Italy
 2005: Kär i natten, Håkon Liu, Sweden
 2004: Thick Lips Thin Lips, Paul Lee, Canada

Audience Award for Best Feature Film

 2021: Law of Love, Barbora Chalupová, Czech Republic
2020: Lola, Laurent Micheli, Belgium
2019: And Then We Danced, Levan Akin, Georgia, Sweden, France
2018: The Miseducation of Cameron Post, Desiree Akhavan, USA
2017: God's Own Country, Francis Lee, UK
 2016: The Queen of Ireland, Conor Horgan, Ireland
 2015: Antonia's Line (Antonia), Marleen Gorris, Netherlands/Belgium/UK
 2014: Children 404 (Дети-404), Askold Kurov & Pavel Loparev, Russia
 2013: Any Day Now, Travis Fine, USA
 2012: Cloudburst, Thom Fitzgerald, Canada
 2011: Weekend, Andrew Haigh, UK
 2010: Sasha, Dennis Todorovic, Germany
 2009: Patrik 1,5, Ella Lemhagen, Sweden
 2008: Breakfast with Scot, Laurie Lynd, Canada
 2007: The Bubble (Ha-Buah), Eytan Fox, Israel
 2006: Whole New Thing, Amnon Buchbinder, Canada
 2005: Supper Man, Albert Vlk, Slovakia
 2004: Mambo Italiano, Émile Gaudreault, USA/Canada
 2003: Together (Tillsammans), Lukas Moodysson, Sweden/Denmark/Italy
 2002: Le fate ignoranti, Ferzan Özpetek, Italy/France
 2001: All About My Mother (Todo sombre mi madre), Pedro Almodóvar, Spain/France

See also
 List of LGBT film festivals

References 

 Vera Sokolova: Representation of Gays and Lesbians in the Mainstream Visual Media (PDF)
 Cerise Howard: Turning X in an XXY World: The 10th Mezipatra Queer Film Festival. Senses of Cinema, December 2009.
 Jan Richter: One on One: Ales Rumpel, head of the Mezipatra Queer Film Festival. Radio Praha, October 2009.
 Mezipatra- Czech GLBT Film Festival. filmfestivalworld.com

External links 
 Official festival website
 Festival organizer
 Festival trailers

LGBT events in the Czech Republic
LGBT festivals in Europe
LGBT film festivals
Film festivals in Prague
Recurring events established in 2000